The Byron Public Cemetery is north of Byron, Wyoming, United States.

References

External links
 
 

Cemeteries in Wyoming